N. laeta may refer to:

 Naticopsis laeta, an extinct snail
 Neptis laeta, a Subsaharan African butterfly
 Nigma laeta, a Central Asian spider
 Nonagria laeta, a North American moth